The 1966 Copa Libertadores Finals were the two-legged final that decided the winner of the 1966 Copa Libertadores, the 7th edition of the Copa Libertadores de América, South America's premier international club football tournament organized by CONMEBOL.

The finals were contested in two-legged home-and-away format between Uruguayan team Peñarol and Argentine team Club Atlético River Plate. The first leg was hosted by Peñarol at Estadio Centenario in Montevideo on 12 May 1966, while the second leg was hosted by River Plate at Estadio Monumental in Buenos Aires on 18 May 1966.

After both teams won one match each, a third game was hosted at Estadio Nacional in Santiago de Chile on 20 May 1966. Peñarol beat River by 4–2 therefore winning their 3rd. Copa Libertadores title.

Qualified teams

Stadiums

Match details

First leg

Second leg

Playoff

Aftermath

The defeat in the playoff v. Peñarol (by 4–2 after River won 2–0 at the end of the first half) was a quite a shock for River Plate. The team returned to Argentina to play the domestic league match v. Banfield. During the match, Banfield supporters threw a chicken (with its body painted a red sash) into the field to make fun of River Plate players.

Since that time, and up to present days, the nickname gallinas has remained to refer to River Plate when the team loses a match that could have won.

Other versions refer to a lack of commitment of some River Plate players, stating that manager Renato Cesarini would have shout "I was betrayed" (by the players) after the match.

At the end of the match, River Plate president Antonio Liberti blamed on Cesarini for the defeat, speaking directly to him: "I think this match was not won by Peñarol. (On the contrary), I think it was River that lost this match. In my opinion, the defeat began from the bench, with the substitutions made. The match was lost by Renato Cesarini". After listening to Liberti, Cesarini agreed with him.

Nevertheless, Liberti held goalkeeper Amadeo Carrizo responsible for the defeat with harsh words to refer to him. Liberti said: "the other responsible is that man, Carrizo... It's easy to mock the rival when conditions are favorable; but someone must know how to be brave in adverse conditions... this man was born well starred. He's the untouchable. I would like to know when he won a responsibility match in 20 years playing for the club... since he stopped that ball with his chest, the match changed... a serious players should not do silly things . To be a man, other things are necessary..."

Notes

References

1966
1966
l
l
l
l